Pētersons (feminine: Pētersone) may refer to:
 Alexander Petersson (Aleksandrs Pētersons; born 1980), an Icelandic handball player
 Ēriks Pētersons (1909–1987), a Latvian footballer and hockey player
 Karina Pētersone (born 1954), a Latvian politician

Latvian-language masculine surnames